Aleksandrovka is a rural locality (a village) in Nikifarovsky Selsoviet, Alsheyevsky District, Bashkortostan, Russia. The population was 21 as of 2010. There is 1 street.

Geography 
Aleksandrovka is located 49 km southwest of Rayevsky (the district's administrative centre) by road. Gayniyamak is the nearest rural locality.

References 

Rural localities in Alsheyevsky District